The men's long jump event  at the 1990 European Athletics Indoor Championships was held in Kelvin Hall on 3 March.

Results

References

Video of the competition with detailed results of the medalists

Long jump at the European Athletics Indoor Championships
Long